LVHS may refer to:
 Lago Vista High School, Lago Vista, Texas
 Lake View High School (Chicago), Illinois, United States
 Lea Valley High School, Enfield, London, England
 Lenape Valley Regional High School, Stanhope, New Jersey, United States
 Loudoun Valley High School, Purcellville, Virginia, United States

 Lander Valley High School, Lander, Wyoming, United States